Mariano Numeriano Monzon Castañeda was a Philippine Constabulary and Philippine Army Chief of Staff of the Armed forces of the Philippines and a recipient the Philippines' highest military award for courage, the Medal of Valor.

Military education and WWII service
Castañeda graduated from the  Philippine Military Academy on 15 November 1915, and from the Infantry School at Fort Benning, United States in 1940. He became President Manuel Quezon's aide-de-camp that same year and fought with the United States Army Forces in the Far East during the Battle of Bataan. He survived the Bataan Death March in 1942 and began organizing resistance against Imperial Japanese occupation, most notably the Fil-American Cavite Guerrilla Forces shortly thereafter. In 1944, the Japanese-controlled Second Philippine Republic appointed him Governor of Cavite. After seven months in office, the Japanese became aware of his guerrilla affiliation and attempted to arrest him; he was able to elude his would-be captors and joined his comrades in the field and he engineered along with his FACGF officers and in coordination with the US 11th Airborne Division General Swing and Col.Jay Vanderpool the battle for the liberation of the province of Cavite

Post-WWII service
Castañeda was appointed Provost Marshal General of the Philippine Army on 1 June 1946. He became Chief of Staff of the Armed Forces of the Philippines two years later.

The night before the Philippine Parity Rights plebiscite in 1947, President Manuel Roxas addressed a rally at Plaza Miranda. He narrowly avoided an assassination attempt by Julio Guillen, a disgruntled barber who threw a grenade on the speaker's platform. José Avelino, the Senate President, saw the bomb and gave it a kick. Castañeda then kicked it further down a set of steps as he covered the President with his own body. The grenade exploded near the audience, killing two people and injuring others. Guillen was arrested and executed via the electric chair on 26 April 1950. Castañeda was conferred the Medal of Valor as a consequence of his actions that night.

Medal of Valor citation
"By direction of the President, pursuant to paragraph 2a, Section I, AFPR 600-45, dated 16 December 1948, the Medal for Valor is hereby awarded to:

On the event of the Party Plebiscite on 10 March 1947, after the late President Roxas had delivered his forceful speech for its approval to about 25,000 people assembled in Plaza, Miranda, Quiapo and to the nation over the National Radio Network, an attempt to assassinate him was made by means of a hand grenade thrown at the President. The deadly missile landed on the speaker’s platform and rolled towards the center of the late President Roxas and other ranking government officials. In spite of the inevitable explosion and its lethal results, General Castañeda, then Chief of the Constabulary, in complete disregard of his personal safety, rushed from his seat behind the President’s chair to the lethal weapon which was about to explode, and with extraordinary coolness and presence of mind ordered the people to lie down and then kicked the death-dealing grenade down the steps of the platform where it exploded. His presence of mind and display of exemplary courage and bravery in the timely disposal of the lethal grenade saved the life of the First President of the Philippines and those of his family and other higher ranking officials of the Republic, who at that moment, were all with him on the platform.."

Death
Mariano Castañeda died in New York City at the age of 77 on 8 September 1970, leaving behind his wife and six children.

References

Chairmen of the Joint Chiefs (Philippines)
Armed Forces of the Philippines Medal of Valor
Recipients of the Philippine Medal of Valor
Philippine Army personnel
Philippine Constabulary personnel
1892 births
1970 deaths
People from Imus
Philippine Military Academy alumni
Quirino administration personnel